This is a list of members of the South Australian House of Assembly from 1997 to 2002, as elected at the 1997 state election:

 The member for Mackillop, Mitch Williams, was elected as an independent, but rejoined the Liberal Party on 6 December 1999.
 The member for Hammond, Peter Lewis, was expelled from the Liberal Party on 6 July 2000. He continued to sit in the Assembly as an independent.
 The member for Fisher, Bob Such, resigned from the Liberal Party on 12 October 2000. He continued to sit in the Assembly as an independent.
 The member for Price, Murray De Laine, resigned from the Labor Party on 15 August 2001 after losing preselection to recontest his seat. He served out the remainder of his term as an independent.
 The member for Ross Smith, Ralph Clarke, resigned from the Labor Party on 27 November 2001 after losing preselection to recontest his seat. He served out the remainder of his term as an independent.

Members of South Australian parliaments by term
21st-century Australian politicians
20th-century Australian politicians